The Church of the Intercession of the Holy Mother of God of Kanaker ( (Kanakeri Surb Tiramor Rus Vughghap'ar Yekeghets'i)), is an active Russian Orthodox church in the old area of Kanaker, Yerevan, Armenia.

History
The church was built in the village of Kanaker-since absorbed by Yerevan-7 kilometres north of the capital's old centre in 1912. Being part of the Yerevan Governorate of the Russian Empire, the church was built to serve the 2nd Caucasian division of the Russian troops deployed near Yerevan, which consisted mainly of Cossacks from Kuban and Poltava. It was designed by the Russian architect Fyodor Verzhbitsky after the fashion typical to military churches. Upon its inauguration, the church was named after Saint Alexander Nevsky.

During the Soviet period, the church was closed and turned into a warehouse, and was reopened with the independence of Armenia in 1991. It was entirely renovated in 2000. The centennial of the church's consecration was commemorated in October 2012, with representatives from the Russian Orthodox Church present.

Gallery

References

Churches completed in 1916
Russian Orthodox Church Outside of Russia
Russian Orthodox church buildings
Eastern Orthodox church buildings in Armenia
20th-century Eastern Orthodox church buildings
20th-century churches in Armenia